Valdisotto (Val de Sota in lombard) is a comune (municipality) in the Province of Sondrio in the Italian region Lombardy, located about  northeast of Milan and about  northeast of Sondrio.

Valdisotto borders the following municipalities: Bormio, Grosio, Sondalo, Valdidentro, Valfurva.

References

Cities and towns in Lombardy